César Sánchez (born 28 February 1962) is a Mexican former Olympic swimmer who competed in the 1984 Summer Olympics.

References

1962 births
Living people
Mexican male swimmers
Mexican male freestyle swimmers
Olympic swimmers of Mexico
Pan American Games competitors for Mexico
Swimmers at the 1979 Pan American Games
Swimmers at the 1984 Summer Olympics
Competitors at the 1978 Central American and Caribbean Games
Central American and Caribbean Games gold medalists for Mexico
Central American and Caribbean Games medalists in swimming
20th-century Mexican people
21st-century Mexican people